SS Louise Lykes was a Type C2-F ship built in 1941 at Federal Shipbuilding of Kearny, New Jersey. She sailed for the Lykes Brothers Steamship Company out of New Orleans, Louisiana.

Career 
Louise Lykes was laid down at Federal Shipbuilding of Kearny, New Jersey, and launched on 27 September 1941. After her October 1941 completion, she was delivered to her owners, the Lykes Brothers Steamship Company, and registered at New Orleans, Louisiana. Very little information on the earliest parts of Louise Lykes career are reported in secondary sources, but some time after the United States entered World War II in December 1941, the ship was armed with one , two , and eight  guns, and a Naval Armed Guard detachment to man them.

Information on most of Louise Lykes wartime activities is also absent from secondary sources, but she is recorded as sailing in Convoy UGF 2 from Hampton Roads, Virginia, to Casablanca in November 1942 with 21 other merchant vessels, and the return convoy, GUF 2, which returned to Hampton Roads on 11 December. Both convoys were escorted across the Atlantic by the American battleship  and other escorts and support ships.

Less than a month after her cruise to Casablanca and back, Louis Lykes departed from New York City for Belfast with a cargo of munitions. Lookouts on Louise Lykes spotted the German vessel and opened fire, straddling the submarine with misses. Although two of the torpedoes were wide of the mark, the other pair did their job and struck home on the cargo ship, igniting her cargo and raining debris on the deck of U-384. After a crash dive to avoid damage at the hands of the exploded American ship, von Rosenberg-Gruszcynski surfaced after five minutes to find no trace of the ship afloat. Master Edwin J. Madden, 9 other officers, 41 crewmen, and 32 Naval Armed Guardsmen were killed in the attack on Louise Lykes, the first of two ships sunk by U-384 during the war.

Notes

References

References 
 

 

Type C2-F ships
Ships built in Kearny, New Jersey
1941 ships
World War II merchant ships of the United States
Ships sunk by German submarines in World War II
World War II shipwrecks in the Atlantic Ocean
Maritime incidents in January 1943
Ships lost with all hands